Calycanthus occidentalis, commonly called spice bush or western sweetshrub, is a species of flowering shrub in the family Calycanthaceae that is native to California and, according to some sources, Washington state. It grows along streams and moist canyons in the foothills of mountains.

Description 
They are more-or-less ovate with acute tips, a rounded base. The flowers appear from late spring to early fall. The tepals enclose about 10–15 stamens. The flowers are pollinated by beetles of the family Nitidulidae.

Distribution and habitat
Calycanthus occidentalis is native to California and, according to some sources, Washington.

References

Calycanthaceae
Flora of California
Flora of Washington (state)
Plants described in 1839